Bayla Falk was a woman of Talmudic learning. She was born in Lemberg about the middle of the sixteenth century, and died at an advanced age at Jerusalem.

Biography
Bayla Falk was a daughter of the philanthropist and head of the community at Lemberg, Israel Edels, and wife of the well-known Talmudist Joshua Falk, author of the Sefer Me'irat 'Enayim. She moved to Jerusalem after her husband's death in 1614.

Bayla had a strong inclination toward Talmudic studies, and gave some decisions on certain difficult halakhic cases. One of these was that on festivals the festive blessing over the lights should be said before and not after the lights are kindled.

References
 

16th-century births
17th-century deaths
16th-century Polish Jews
17th-century Polish Jews
Ashkenazi Jews in Ottoman Palestine
Rebbetzins
People from Lviv
People from Ruthenian Voivodeship
Polish emigrants to the Ottoman Empire